Ivan Joseph Welsh (25 February 1940 – 15 March 2007) was an Australian politician.

Born in Newcastle, Welsh attended Newcastle Boys' High School from 1952 to 1955 and served in the army from 1958 to 1967, including periods in Malaya (1958–60) and Vietnam (1965–66) as a Linguist and Intelligence officer. In 1961, he married Lorraine Gay Cox. After his military service concluded, he became a restaurateur, caterer and salesman, and in 1984 was elected to Lake Macquarie City Council, becoming mayor in 1987.

In 1988, he was elected to the New South Wales Legislative Assembly as an Independent, representing the seat of Swansea. He held the seat until his defeat by the Labor candidate Don Bowman in 1991, in which year he also lost the mayoralty. He continued to contest both state and federal elections, both as an Independent and (in 1996) as a member of the Liberal Party. Welsh died in Newcastle in 2007, at the age of 67. He was cremated.

References

1940 births
2007 deaths
People educated at Newcastle Boys' High School
Independent members of the Parliament of New South Wales
Members of the New South Wales Legislative Assembly
20th-century Australian politicians